Rajinder Kaur Bulara (born 1946) is a politician of the Shiromani Akali Dal (Mann) group and was a member of the 9th Lok Sabha.

Early life
Rajinder Kaur was born at Raja Jung, Lahore district of undivided India on 10 June 1946 to Sardar Harsa Singh Sandhu and his wife. She attended the Dev Samaj College for Women at Firozpur and holds bachelor's degrees in Arts and Education.

Career
Kaur participated in the relief work following the 1984 anti-Sikh riots. She was the official candidate of Shiromani Akali Dal (Mann) from Ludhiana during the 1989 Indian general election. She defeated Gurcharan Singh Galib of the Indian National Congress by a margin of 1,33,729 votes and was elected to the 9th Lok Sabha. As a Member of Parliament, she was a member of the Consultative Committee for the Ministry of Industry. She contested the 2002 Punjab Legislative Assembly election from Ludhiana West but could secure only 3.30% of the total votes polled.

Personal life
Rajinder married Sardar Rajinder Pal Singh Gill on 17 November 1967. A professor of the Punjab Agricultural University, he was killed in a fake police encounter for allegedly being a militant. She has two children from him.

References

Shiromani Akali Dal politicians
1946 births
Living people
India MPs 1989–1991
Lok Sabha members from Punjab, India
Politicians from Lahore
Politicians from Ludhiana
People from Kasur District
Women members of the Lok Sabha
Women in Punjab, India politics
20th-century Indian women
20th-century Indian people